Netawaka is a city in Jackson County, Kansas, United States.  As of the 2020 census, the population of the city was 139.

History
Netawaka was founded in 1866. Netawaka is a Pottawatami Native American name meaning "grand view".

The first post office in Netawaka was established in January 1868.

Geography
Netawaka is located at  (39.603238, -95.718753).

Demographics

2010 census
At the 2010 census there were 143 people in 58 households, including 43 families, in the city. The racial makeup of the city was 97.9% White, 0.7% African American, and 1.4% Native American. Hispanic or Latino of any race were 1.4%.

Of the 58 households 31.0% had children under the age of 18 living with them, 62.1% were married couples living together, 6.9% had a female householder with no husband present, 5.2% had a male householder with no wife present, and 25.9% were non-families. 24.1% of households were one person and 6.9% were one person aged 65 or older. The average household size was 2.47 and the average family size was 2.88.

The median age was 44.5 years. 23.8% of residents were under the age of 18; 5.6% were between the ages of 18 and 24; 21% were from 25 to 44; 39.2% were from 45 to 64; and 10.5% were 65 or older. The gender makeup of the city was 53.8% male and 46.2% female.

2000 census
At the 2000 census there were 170 people in 62 households, including 47 families, in the city. The racial makeup of the city was 94.12% White, 5.29% Native American, and 0.59% from two or more races.

Of the 62 households 40.3% had children under the age of 18 living with them, 64.5% were married couples living together, 6.5% had a female householder with no husband present, and 22.6% were non-families. 22.6% of households were one person and 9.7% were one person aged 65 or older. The average household size was 2.74 and the average family size was 3.10.

The age distribution was 31.2% under the age of 18, 5.9% from 18 to 24, 27.1% from 25 to 44, 25.3% from 45 to 64, and 10.6% 65 or older. The median age was 36 years. For every 100 females, there were 123.7 males. For every 100 females age 18 and over, there were 98.3 males.

The median household income was $30,417 and the median family income  was $35,000. Males had a median income of $29,688 versus $16,719 for females. The per capita income for the city was $13,705. About 20.5% of families and 19.0% of the population were below the poverty line, including 25.4% of those under the age of eighteen and 45.5% of those sixty five or over.

Education
The community is served by North Jackson USD 335 public school district.

See also
 Central Branch Union Pacific Railroad

References

Further reading

External links
 Netawaka - Directory of Public Officials
 Netawaka history
 Netawaka city map, KDOT

Cities in Kansas
Cities in Jackson County, Kansas